Parkson Holdings Berhad (doing business as Parkson;) is an Asian-based department store operator with an extensive network of 131 stores as of 2017, spanning approximately 2.1 million m2 of retail space across cities in Malaysia, China, Vietnam, Laos and Myanmar.

Stores in Malaysia
Parkson opened its first store at Sungei Wang Plaza in 1987. Since then, new stores have been rolled out across the country at approximately two stores per annum over the past 27 years. Their first flagship store at Pavilion KL was opened in 2007.

As of 29 July 2021, Parkson has 41 stores in Malaysia (38 Parkson, 3 Parkson Elite). Parkson is on a consolidation journey, which it had recently closed down its Maju Junction branch in Kuala Lumpur and then opened a branch in M Square Mall, a retail and lifestyle hub in Puchong, which was closed after 18 months of operation.

Stores outside Malaysia

China
In 1994, Parkson opened its first department store in Beijing. Parkson is one of the first foreign department store chains to establish a presence in China. 
As of June 2015, Parkson has an extensive network of 60 stores covering 37 major cities in China.

Vietnam
The opening of Parkson Saigon Tourist Plaza on 29 June 2005 marked the entrance of Parkson as the first truly international department store to be opened in Ho Chi Minh City. On 2 January 2015, Parkson closed its store at Keangnam Landmark Tower, Hanoi, as the store has been loss-making since its opening in December 2011. Nevertheless, Parkson remains positive on the retail market in Vietnam, as evidenced by opening a new store in Danang on 11 January 2015. As of 3 January 2021, Parkson has 4 stores across 3 cities.

Indonesia (formerly)
Parkson entered the country by acquiring PT. Tozy Sentosa, the operator of Centro Department Store in 2011. Centro Department Store itself was developed by Suzy Darmawan Hutomo, master licensor holder for The Body Shop in Indonesia and sole daughter of Matahari founder, Hari Darmawan. Prior to the acquisition, Centro opened its first store at Plaza Semanggi, Jakarta in November 2003, followed by opening stores at Discovery Shopping Mall Bali, Plaza Ambarrukmo Jogjakarta, Margo City Depok, Mall of Indonesia Jakarta, and Summarecon Mall Serpong Tangerang.

After the acquisition, the department store network has since expanded to a total of 11 stores under the Centro brand and two stores under the Parkson brand, leading to a total of 14 stores (including Kem Chicks supermarket at Pacific Place Jakarta. Parkson Gourmet Market at Bintaro CBD, opened on 3 November 2016 but closed sometime in 2017) as of 1 December 2020.

The country's first Parkson store opened its door at Centre Point Mall, Medan on 28 November 2013. The second Parkson store at Lippo Mall Puri, Jakarta commenced operation on 27 June 2014 (closed in 2020 due to low sales and COVID-19 pandemic). The third Parkson store at Hartono Mall, Yogyakarta commenced operation on 22 December 2015.

According to the company website, the Centro brand will be focused on the middle-class segment while the Parkson brand focuses on the upper-middle-class.

In March 2021, PT. Tozy Sentosa were sued to bankruptcy due to failed payments to various vendors. Centro stores at Plaza Ambarrukmo, Jogjakarta and Bintaro Jaya Xchange Mall, Tangerang closed down following the lawsuit. Before that, however, two Centro branches at Mall of Indonesia and Plaza Semanggi, Jakarta were closed in 2018, followed by the Summarecon Mall Serpong branch on 3 January 2021. In April 2021, Parkson Hartono Mall and Centro Solo Paragon Mall closed its doors, and finally, on 17 May 2021, the company was officially declared bankrupt by court.

Myanmar
Parkson entered the country with the opening of its first store at FMI Centre, Yangoon, on 11 May 2013.

Laos
Parkson opened its first store in the Sisattanak district of Vientiane in February 2020.

References

External links
Parkson Malaysia
Parkson China 
Parkson Vietnam
Centro Indonesia
Parkson Indonesia 
Parkson Retail Asia Limited

1987 establishments in Malaysia
Companies based in Kuala Lumpur
Retail companies established in 1987
Department stores of Malaysia
Retail companies of Malaysia
Malaysian brands
Companies listed on Bursa Malaysia
Multinational companies headquartered in Malaysia